

Günter Vollmer (15 May 1917 – 10 December 2004) was a highly decorated officer in the Wehrmacht of Nazi Germany during World War II, and a recipient of the Knight's Cross of the Iron Cross.

Awards  

 Knight's Cross of the Iron Cross on 20 April 1943 as Oberleutnant of the Reserves and leader of the 3./Grenadier-Regiment 411

References

Citations

Bibliography

 

1917 births
2004 deaths
Military personnel from Berlin
Bundeswehr generals
People from the Province of Brandenburg
Recipients of the Knight's Cross of the Iron Cross
Major generals of the German Army